De Guitenstreken van Jopie Slim en Dickie Bigmans (The Jolly Pranks of Jopie Slim and Dickie Bigmans) is a 1939 Dutch children's film based a popular British comic strip, Billy Bimbo and Peter Porker  by Harry Folkard, which ran in The London Evening News but became far more popular in the Netherlands under its translation Jopie Slim en Dickie Bigmans. The picture was basically an amateur movie made for youth halls and children's matinees.

Plot

The film follows Jopie and Dickie as they play pranks on their environment and are punished for it.

Cast
 George Ligtvoet: Dickie Bigmans
 Jan van Dommelen, jr.: Jopie Slim
 Jan Springer: Friend of Jopie and Dickie
 Henk Teune: Policeman
 Pedro Beukman: Father miller
 Tine Beukman: Amalia Kippig

Sources

External links
 https://www.eyefilm.nl/collectie/filmgeschiedenis/film/de-guitenstreken-van-jopie-slim-en-dickie-bigmans

1930s Dutch-language films
Dutch black-and-white films
Dutch comedy films
Dutch children's films
Films based on British comics
Films based on Dutch comics
Films set in the Netherlands
Films shot in the Netherlands
Live-action films based on comics
1939 comedy films